Cade Patrick Fairchild (born January 15, 1989) is an American professional ice hockey defenseman. He is currently an unrestricted free agent who most recently played for KalPa in the Finnish Liiga. He was selected by the St. Louis Blues in the 4th round (96th overall) of the 2007 NHL Entry Draft.

Fairchild competed at the 2006 IIHF World U18 Championships where he won a gold medal as a member of Team USA. He was also a member of the USA U-18 team at the 2007 IIHF U-18 World Championship, where he led all defensemen in points.

Playing career
Prior to turning professional, Fairchild attended the University of Minnesota where he was the top scoring defenseman with the Minnesota Golden Gophers men's ice hockey team which competes in NCAA's Division I in the WCHA conference. On March 18, 2011, Fairchild was signed to a three-year entry-level contract with the St. Louis Blues.

On November 29, 2011, Fairchild made his NHL debut playing 14 shifts in the Blues' 2-1 victory over the home team Washington Capitals. Five days after his NHL debut, Fairchild was returned to the Peoria Rivermen of the American Hockey League (AHL).

In 2012, Fairchild was named an AHL All-Star, and also named to the AHL All Rookie Team. He was recalled 4 times to St. Louis and played 5 games, tallying 1 assist.

During the 2013–14 season, having had his season hampered by injury and his development stagnating within the Blues organization, on March 12, 2014 Fairchild was traded by St. Louis to the Phoenix Coyotes and assigned to their AHL affiliate, the Portland Pirates.

Fairchild was not re-signed by the Coyotes, and on July 8, 2014, he agreed to a one-year with Russian club, Metallurg Novokuznetsk of the KHL. He left Metallurg after a second season with the club and took up an offer from Sweden, signing with Rögle BK on July 9, 2016.

In October 2018, Fairchild joined KalPa in the Finnish Liiga from Dinamo Riga in the Kontinental Hockey League.

Career statistics

Regular season and playoffs

International

Awards and honors

References

External links

1989 births
Living people
American men's ice hockey defensemen
Chicago Wolves players
Dinamo Riga players
Ice hockey people from Duluth, Minnesota
Kalamazoo Wings (ECHL) players
KalPa players
Metallurg Novokuznetsk players
Minnesota Golden Gophers men's ice hockey players
Peoria Rivermen (AHL) players
Portland Pirates players
Rögle BK players
St. Louis Blues draft picks
St. Louis Blues players
USA Hockey National Team Development Program players